Tufts is a surname. Notable people with the surname include:

 Bob Tufts (1955–2019), American baseball player
 Charles Tufts (1781–1876), American businessman and philanthropist
 Daryn Tufts (born 1973), American writer, director, producer, and actor
 Eleanor Tufts (1927–1991), American art historian
 Glenn Tufts (born 1954), American baseball player, manager, and scout
 Henry Tufts (1748–1831), American criminal
 James Tufts (1829–1884), American politician
 James Hayden Tufts (1862–1942), American philosopher
 James Walker Tufts (1835–1902), American businessman
 John Tufts (music educator) (1689–1750), colonial American music educator
 John Q. Tufts (1840–1908), American politician
 Nathan A. Tufts (1879–1952), American lawyer and politician
 Otis Tufts (1804–1869), American inventor
 Patrick Tufts, American computer scientists
 Peter Tufts (1617–1700), colonial American landowner 
 Richard Tufts (1896–1980), American golf administrator
 Robert Tufts (disambiguation), multiple people
 Sean Tufts (born 1982), American football player
 Sonny Tufts (1911–1970), American actor
 Terry Tufts (born 1954), Canadian singer-songwriter
 Warren Tufts (1925–1982), American comics artist and writer

See also
Tuft (surname)
Tufte, surname
Toft (disambiguation), include a list of people with surname Toft
Tofte (disambiguation), includes a list of people with surname Tofte